Poy sang long is a rite of passage ceremony among the Shan peoples, in Myanmar and in neighbouring northern Thailand, undergone by boys at some point between seven and fourteen years of age. It consists of taking novice monastic vows and participating in monastery life for a period of time that can vary from a week to many months or more. Usually, a large group of boys are ordained as sāmaṇera (novitiate monk) at the same time.

Etymology
The Tai Yai name poy sang long is decomposed as follows:
 poy (ပွႆး) meaning 'event', borrowed from Burmese pwe;
sang (သၢင်ႇ), thought to come from either khun sang ('brahman') or sang ('novice monk');
long (လွင်း), from along meaning Bodhisattva or 'king's lineage', borrowed from Burmese alaung (အလောင်း). Long (လွင်း), from Burmese laung (လောင်း), also means "stage before the final change." Thus, sang long (သၢင်ႇလွင်း) refers to a "boy or young man before becoming a novice monk."

Observances

In neighbouring Thailand, where Shan immigrants have brought over the traditions from Myanmar, the ceremony goes on for three days, as the boys (dressed like princes in imitation of Gautama Buddha, who was himself a prince before setting out on the religious path) spend the entire time being carried around on the shoulders of their older male relatives. On the third day, they are ordained, and enter the monastery for a period of at least one week, and perhaps many years.

See also
Pabbajjā
Upasampadā
Shinbyu

References

External links

"The Poy Sang Long Festival" in Chiangrai Magazine
"The Poy Sang Long Festival" by Thanapol Chadchaidee
Poi Sang Long Festival in Chiang Dao
Shan Tradition Rules in a Northern Thai Town Sai Silp, The Irrawaddy, April 2007
"Shan - Rites of Passage - Sang Long" in Chiang Mai
Colorful 2015 Poi Sang Long
"Poi Sang Long Festival (Beloved Sons) Mueang Mae Hong Son" in Festivals of Thailand

Ceremonies
Buddhist festivals in Myanmar
Children's festivals
Burmese culture
Buddhist festivals in Thailand
Rites of passage
Buddhism and children